The Ottawa Lady Senators is a women's ice hockey organization, based in Ottawa, Ontario, Canada. The organization organizes teams in several age divisions, including Intermediate in the Provincial Women's Hockey League (PWHL). The women's senior-level ice hockey team formerly played in the Canadian Women's Hockey League (CWHL), until 2010. The senior team was formerly known as the Ottawa Capital Canucks  and the  Ottawa Raiders.

History

The club began as the National Capital Raiders in 1998, becoming the Ottawa Raiders in 1999. The club played in the National Women's Hockey League (NWHL) from 1999 until 2007, when the league folded. In 2007-08, the club re-organized as the Ottawa Capital Canucks, playing in the CWHL. For the 2007–08 season, the team played at the Sandy Hill Arena in central Ottawa.

In 2008, the Canucks team merged its operations with the Kanata Girls Hockey Association. The new organization was named the Ottawa Senators Women's Hockey Club, was partly sponsored by the Ottawa Senators NHL club, and operated three teams. The Senior AAA team played in the CWHL, the Intermediate team plays in the Provincial Women's Hockey League, and there is a Midget AA team that plays a tournament schedule. The new organization is based out of the Bell Sensplex in the Kanata suburb of Ottawa.

In 2010, it was announced that the CWHL would reduce its number of teams to five. The Senior AAA Ottawa Senators were disbanded and are no longer playing in the CWHL. The Intermediates and other level programs continue, and the Intermediate AA team is now a member of the Provincial Women's Hockey League.

Current Roster 2022–2023

Notable Former Players
Katie Weatherston
Jamie Lee Rattray
Erica Howe
Stefanie McKeough
Fannie Desforges

References

External links
  CWHL web site
  Team's new Website
  Team's old Website

Women's ice hockey leagues in Canada
Ice hockey teams in Ottawa
Canadian Women's Hockey League teams
Defunct ice hockey teams in Canada
National Women's Hockey League (1999–2007) teams
1998 establishments in Ontario
Ice hockey clubs established in 1998
Women in Ontario
Amateur ice hockey